In ancient Greek geography, the basin of the Indus River (north India and central and eastern Pakistan) was on the extreme eastern fringe of the known world.
The Greek geographer Herodotus (5th century BC) describes India, calling it  (Roman transliteration: hē Hindikē chōrē, meaning "the Indian land"), after Hinduš, the Old Persian name of the Indus river and its inhabitants, the associated satrapy of Sindh in the Achaemenid Empire. Darius the Great had conquered this territory in 516 BC. The Greek colonies in Asia Minor (western and central Turkey) were already part of the Achaemenid Empire since 546 BC and, thus, the Greeks and Indians came into contact with each other as  subjects of the Empire.

Background 
According to Herodotus 4.44, Scylax of Caryanda, a Greek explorer sailed down the length of the Indus in the service of Darius. Hecataeus of Miletus, around 500 BC, wrote about the geography and peoples of India. The Greek physician Ctesias also wrote about India. Most of these works have not survived in their original form but fragments are known through transmission by later writers. Not only individual Greeks, but also large groups of Greeks were forced to settle in Bactria (northern Afghanistan), who must have had prolonged contact with Indians. Herodotus's account is believed to be based on these accounts.

Description 
The Greeks (or Persians) were not aware of the geography of India (or Asia in general) east of the Indus basin. Herodotus in 4.40 is explicit about India being on the eastern fringe of the inhabitable world,
 "As far as India, Asia is an inhabited land; but thereafter, all to the east is desolation, nor can anyone say what kind of land is there." (trans.  A. D. Godley 1920)
But he knew of Indians (Hindwan) living beyond the Persian province of Hinduš (3.101):
 "These Indians dwell far away from the Persians southwards, and were no subjects of King Darius." (trans.  A. D. Godley 1920)

In book 3 (3.89-97), Herodotus gives some account of the peoples of India; he describes them as being very diverse, and makes reference to their dietary habits, some eating raw fish, others eating raw meat, and yet others practicing  vegetarianism. He also mentions their dark skin colour. 
"The tribes of Indians are numerous, and they do not all speak the same language—some are wandering tribes, others not. They who dwell in the marshes along the river live on raw fish, which they take in boats made of reeds, each formed out of a single joint. These Indians wear a dress of sedge, which they cut in the river and bruise; afterwards they weave it into mats, and wear it as we wear a breast-plate. Eastward of these Indians are another tribe, called Padaeans, who are wanderers, and live on raw flesh. [...]  There is another set of Indians whose customs are very different. They refuse to put any live animal to death, they sow no corn, and have no dwelling-houses. Vegetables are their only food. [...] All the tribes which I have mentioned live together like the brute beasts: they have also all the same tint of skin, which approaches that of the Ethiopians. [...]  Besides these, there are Indians of another tribe, who border on the city of Caspatyrus, and the country of Pactyica; these people dwell northward of all the rest of the Indians, and follow nearly the same mode of life as the Bactrians. They are more warlike than any of the other tribes, and from them the men are sent forth who go to procure the gold. For it is in this part of India that the sandy desert lies. Here, in this desert, there live amid the sand great ants, in size somewhat less than dogs, but bigger than foxes. [...]" (trans. Rawlinson)

In 3.38, Herodotus mentions the Indian tribe of the Callatiae for their practice of funerary cannibalism; in a striking illustration of cultural relativism, he points out that this people is just as dismayed at the notion of the Greeks practicing cremation as the Greeks are at that of eating their dead parents.  In book 7 (7.65,70,86,187) and in 8.113 Herodotus describes the Indian infantry and cavalry employed in Xerxes' army.

Only after the conquests of Alexander the Great and the emergence of the Indo-Greek kingdoms did the Mediterranean world acquire some first-hand knowledge about the region (conversely, Indians also became aware of the existence of the Greeks during this period, naming them Yavana in Sanskrit). 
By the 3rd century BC, Eratosthenes recognized "India" as terminating in a peninsula (reflecting a first grasp of the geography of the Indian Subcontinent) instead of just placing it generically at the far eastern end of "Asia". Eratosthenes was also the first Greek author to postulate an island Taprobane at the far south of India, later becoming a name of Sri Lanka. European knowledge of the geography of India did not become much better resolved until the end of Antiquity, and remained at this stage throughout the Middle Ages, only becoming more detailed with the beginning of the Age of Sail in the 15th century.

See also
Greco-Roman geography
Early world maps
Cartography of India
Names for India
The Padaei
Gymnosophists
Buddhism and the Roman world

References

Bibliography

External links
 Herodotus – The History of the Persian Wars: A Description of India, extracted from Herodotus, The History, George Rawlinson, trans., (New York: Dutton & Co., 1862), Then Again World History web site, retrieved 20 May 2018.

Herodotus
Geographic history of India
Ancient history of Pakistan
Classical geography